Rocky Bottom is an unincorporated community located in northern Pickens County, South Carolina  north of Pickens, South Carolina,  south of Rosman, North Carolina and  northwest of Greenville, South Carolina. The Foothills Trail also makes its way through Rocky Bottom and there is an area for trail goers to park and experience the trail.

External links

Geography of Pickens County, South Carolina
Towns in South Carolina